Ritidian Point is the northernmost point of the island of Guam (13° 39′ 2″ N).  It is owned by the US Fish and Wildlife Service which administers the area as part of the Guam National Wildlife Refuge.

References

Headlands of Guam
Yigo, Guam